The Rio do Peixe State Park is a state park in the state of São Paulo, Brazil.

Location

The Rio do Peixe State Park is divided between the municipalities of Dracena, Ouro Verde, Piquerobi and Presidente Venceslau, São Paulo.
The park would be part of the proposed Trinational Biodiversity Corridor, which aims to provide forest connections between conservation units in Brazil, Paraguay and Argentina in the Upper Paraná ecoregion.

Environment

The park protects the margins of the Rio do Peixe, a left tributary of the Paraná River, in a region near its mouth where it meanders through várzea interspersed with permanent or temporary lagoons. Due to its similarity with the Pantanal, this section of the Rio do Peixe is sometimes called the "São Paulo Pantanal".
The park is rich in bird species, including several threatened with extinction.

Threats include hunting, fishing and bait collection for fishing.

History

Other protected areas created to compensate for the dam were the  Rio Ivinhema State Park, the  Aguapeí State Park and the  Cisalpina Private Natural Heritage Reserve.

The areas of the park were declared of public utility on 22 February 2005.
Fishing regulations were published on 2 October 2008, covering conservation areas and their buffer zones in the Paraná River basin.
They were the Morro do Diabo State Park, Rio do Peixe State Park, Aguapeí State Park, Mico Leão Preto Ecological Station, Ivinhema State Park, Ilha Grande National Park, Caiuá Ecological Station and Iguaçu National Park.
As of 2016 property ownership in the Rio do Peixe State Park had still not been regularized.
When the properties have been acquired they will be donated by CESP to the state of São Paulo.

On 9 June 2016 State Governor Geraldo Alckmin and Secretary of the Environment Patricia Iglecias attended a ceremony  to plant seedlings of native Atlantic Forest trees as part of the project to restore a  area of the park.
On 15 June 2016 SEMA announced that the state park would start to receive visitors after construction of an access point from the SP-563 highway.
The access point would lead to the park headquarters, with a visitor center, administrative offices, workshop and warehouse, and accommodations for visitors, students and researchers. 
These buildings had not yet been completed due to technical and legal delays.

Notes

Sources

State parks of Brazil
Protected areas of São Paulo (state)
2002 establishments in Brazil
Protected areas of the Atlantic Forest